Scream is the first full-length solo album from Belgian rock musician Sam Bettens (as Sarah Bettens).  In 2004, Bettens released a five-track EP called Go.  Four of the songs from Go were included on Scream; only "Grey" did not make the cut.

Scream was released in Europe on March 14, 2005, and in the United States on August 23, 2005.

Track listing
"Scream" (Emerson Swinford; Guy Erez; Matthew Gerrard; Sam Bettens)
"Stay" (Sam Bettens; Steve Booker)
"Come over Here" (Jimmy Harry; Sam Bettens)
"Not Insane" (Sam Bettens)
"Turn Around" (Sam Bettens)
"Go" (Sam Bettens)
"Don't Stop" (John O'Brien; Sam Bettens)
"Fine" (Greg Wells; Sam Bettens)
"One Second" (Sam Bettens)
"Sister" (Sam Bettens)
"She Says" (Greg Wells; Kara DioGuardi; Sam Bettens)
"Follow Me" (Sam Bettens)
"Don't Let Me Drag You Down" (Sam Bettens)
"I'm Okay" (Sam Bettens)

2005 albums
Sam Bettens albums
European Border Breakers Award-winning albums